The 2018 Yale Bulldogs football team represented Yale University in the 2018 NCAA Division I FCS football season. The season marked the Bulldogs's 146th overall season. The team played its home games at Yale Bowl in New Haven, Connecticut and were led by seventh-year head coach Tony Reno. They were members of the Ivy League. They finished the season 5–5 overall and 3–4 in Ivy League play to place in three-way tie for fourth. Yale averaged 7,657 fans per game.

Previous season
The Bulldogs finished the 2017 season 9–1, 6–1 in Ivy League play to become Ivy League champions for the first time since 2006 (when they shared the title) and to earn their first sole league title since 1980.

Preseason

Award watch lists

Schedule

Game summaries

at Holy Cross

at Cornell

Maine

Dartmouth

Mercer

at Penn

at Columbia

Brown

Princeton

vs. Harvard

Roster

References

Yale
Yale Bulldogs football seasons
Yale Bulldogs football